Blood Feast (Spanish: La noche de los mil gatos,  Night of a Thousand Cats) is a 1972 Mexican exploitation horror film written and directed by René Cardona Jr. It was released in the United States in 1974.

Plot
Hugo, a playboy serial killer (Hugo Stiglitz), stalks beautiful women in his helicopter, seducing them under false pretenses and inviting them to his castle estate. There, he kills them in various gruesome ways with the help of his groundskeeper, Dorgo. He then uses their flesh to feed a plethora of cats that he keeps in a fenced-in pit, and preserves their pickled heads as trophies inside glass jars. A doctor who stops by the castle and eventually even his groundskeeper also become meals for the cats. Finally, one brave woman defies death and miraculously escapes his clutches, accidentally making a hole in the fence around the cat pit (which eventually allows the cats to escape). During the fight, Hugo gets hit in the face. Sensing his injury, the cats gang up, descend upon Hugo, and finish him off, allowing the woman to escape.

Cast

Release
The film was released under the title Night of a Thousand Cats in Tampa, Florida on 1 November 1974.

Critical response
Shock Cinema Magazine deemed Blood Feast possibly "the worst film ever made about killer felines", and said it was very silly with little entertainment value and bad acting, although still better than Cardona's later films. The Terror Trap gave it 2 stars, calling it "rather unimpressive", "mild", "drab", and "uninspired". Tars Tarkas suggested that cats are intrinsically not very scary, even when there's a thousand of them, rating the film 2/10. Aggressions Animales reckoned it one of René Cardona Jr's worst films, and said that aside from a few of its ideas, there was nothing interesting.

Home media
VCI Entertainment issued a double-feature Blu-ray in June 2022 which also features Mary, Mary, Bloody Mary (1972).

Technical details
Blood Feast was shot in color. It was released in the US in 1974 with an 'R' rating by the MPAA. Unedited, it runs 93 minutes; the American version, however, runs 63 minutes. The movie was filmed in Spanish, but has been dubbed in English.

Legacy
Blood Feast has a very small fan base, but has made a home for itself among exploitation film fans. At its release, the film caused mild controversy due to its seemingly cruel treatment of cats. One scene depicts Hugo violently grabbing a large white cat and tossing it over a high wall into its pen. The camera does not cut away, indicating that the real cat was thrown.

References

External links

 Night of a Thousand Cats, Cats in Film

1972 films
English-language Mexican films
1972 horror films
1970s exploitation films
1970s serial killer films
Mexican slasher films
Films about cats
Films set in castles
1970s English-language films
1970s Mexican films